Thới Lai is a new rural district (huyện) of Cần Thơ City in the Mekong Delta region of Vietnam. As of 2009 the district had a population of 120,964, rising to 147,546 in 2018. The district covers an area of 255.66 km2. The district capital lies at Thới Lai. The district was formed in 2009 from the southern portion of Cờ Đỏ district.

The district borders Phong Điền and Ô Môn districts to the east, Cờ Đỏ district and Kiên Giang province to the west, Phong Điền District and Hậu Giang province to the south and Cờ Đỏ and Ô Môn districts to the north.

Administrative divisions
The district is divided into one commune-level town, Thới Lai, and 13 communes: Thới Thạnh, Tân Thạnh, Định Môn, Trường Thành, Trường Xuân, Trường Xuân A, Trường Xuân B, Trường Thắng, Xuân Thắng, Thới Tân, Đông Bình and Đông Thuận.

References

External links 
Map of Thới Lai District

Districts of Cần Thơ